Bağpınar can refer to:

 Bağpınar, Adıyaman
 Bağpınar, Tercan